is a Japanese architect. He is the Representative Director and an architect at Atelier Riga T Architect and Associates Co. Ltd. From 2002 to 2014 he was a special lecturer at Kogakuin University. He was also a special lecturer at the Nagaoka Institute of Design from 2002 to 2017.

Biography

Awards

References

External links 
 Atelier Riga T Architect and Associates Co. Ltd. Profile Page

Japanese architects
1951 births
People from Niigata Prefecture
Living people